Miguel Ángel Cascallana Guerra (February 26, 1948 – January 26, 2015) was a Spanish handball player who competed in the 1972 Summer Olympics.

In 1972 he was part of the Spanish team which finished fifteenth in the Olympic tournament. He played all five matches and scored three goals.

References

External links
 Sports Reference

1948 births
2015 deaths
Spanish male handball players
Olympic handball players of Spain
Handball players at the 1972 Summer Olympics